The 2005 IAAF World Outdoor Meetings was the third and final edition of the annual global series of one-day track and field competitions organized by the International Association of Athletics Federations (IAAF). The series had four levels: 2005 IAAF Golden League, IAAF Super Grand Prix, IAAF Grand Prix and IAAF Grand Prix II. There were 6 Golden League meetings, 8 Super Grand Prix category meetings, 10 IAAF Grand Prix category meetings and 10 Grand Prix II meetings, making a combined total of 34 meetings for the series.

The series hosted the same number of meetings as the previous year. The Helsinki Grand Prix was restored to the Grand Prix circuit after skipping 2004, while the Adidas Oregon Track Classic was dropped from the Grand Prix II category. Three meetings changed venue from 2003: the Bislett Games returned to Oslo from Bergen following stadium developments, the Athens Grand Prix Tsiklitiria was moved from Heraklion to Athens, and the Norwich Union Super Grand Prix moved from Gateshead to Sheffield.

Performances on designated events on the circuit earned athletes points which qualified them for entry to the 2005 IAAF World Athletics Final, held on 9–10 September Monaco.

The IAAF World Outdoor Meetings circuit was replaced by the IAAF World Athletics Tour the following year.

Meetings

References

2005
IAAF Grand Prix